Jockey Club Government Secondary School or JCGSS, formed in 1960, is a government funded full-time secondary school in Oxford Road, Kowloon Tong, Hong Kong. The school was named after the Royal Hong Kong Jockey Club who funded the construction of the school building complex.

History
Jockey Club Government Secondary School was established in 1960 as Jockey Club Modern School. In the 1950s to 60's Hong Kong, 41% (according to the census) of the population were under the age of 15. It was due to the mass migration of Chinese refugees arrived in Hong Kong after the civil war. It presented an education crisis to the Government because the number of existing schools was not enough to cater the need of the children. As a result, a lot of schools were established in order to resolve the issue and JCGSS was one of them.

Due to the urgent need of education for a large population, classes was temporarily held in Perth Street Government School until 10 October 1961, when the current 3 storey building complex was completed. The school was divided to Morning School and Afternoon School in order to provide maximum number of seats. Both schools provided 3-year education aimed at preparing students for direct entry into employment or for further vocational training. The school was named after the Royal Hong Kong Jockey Club (now Hong Kong Jockey Club) which provided fund of HK$17.7 million for the construction of the building.

In 1963, the school was expanded to provide the standard 5-year secondary education and renamed Jockey Club Government Secondary Technical School. In the next year, JCGSTS became a full day school in order to offer better educational environment for students.
In 1975, the school was once again expanded, to provide the 7-year full secondary education.
The school was renamed to Jockey Club Government Secondary School in 1997.

Principals
Mr Tristan (Morning School); Mr S. K. Buse (Afternoon School) (1960–1963)
Mr Barns (1963–1969)
Mr H. J. Head (1969–1975)
Mr Sit Chun Hoi(1975–1988)
Mr Chan Ping-tat (1988–1992)
Mr Chan Ping-yuen (1992–1994)
Mr Wong Yin-chun (1994–1996)
Mr Yung Ye-sau (1996–1997)
Mr Leung Woon-man (1997–2005)
Mr Hung Chun-may (2005–2007)
Mrs Chan O Sui-fong (2007–2011)
Ms YUEN Ka-chung (2011–2015)
Mr. To Kok-on (2015–2017)
Mrs. Leung Lui King (2017–present)

See also
Jockey Club Ti-I College

Government schools in Hong Kong
Kowloon City District
Kowloon Tsai
Secondary schools in Hong Kong